The Forgotten Law is a 1922 American silent melodrama film starring Milton Sills and directed by James W. Horne. The story was adapted from the 1906 novel A Modern Madonna by Caroline Abbot Stanley.

It is not known whether the film currently survives.

Plot

Cast
 Milton Sills as Richard Jarnette
 Jack Mulhall at Victor Jarnette
 Cleo Ridgely as Margaret
 Alec B. Francis as Judge Kirtley
 Muriel Frances Dana as Muriel
 Alice Hollister as Rosalie
 Edneh Altemus as Flo
 Lucretia Harris as Mammy Cely
 Walter Law as Detective

References

External links

Review in The Film Daily, via Internet Archive

1922 films
American black-and-white films
American silent feature films
Films based on American novels
Films directed by James W. Horne
Silent American drama films
1922 drama films
Melodrama films
Metro Pictures films
Films with screenplays by Joseph F. Poland
1920s American films